The Armoire is a 2009 Canadian short drama film directed by Jamie Travis. The third film in his Saddest Children in the World trilogy following Why the Anderson Children Didn't Come to Dinner and The Saddest Boy in the World, the film stars William Cuddy as Aaron, a young boy whose friend Tony (Ricardo Hoyos) has gone missing during a game of hide and seek, who is undergoing hypnosis to determine whether he can remember anything that may assist in locating Tony.

The film received an honourable mention for Best Canadian Short Film at the 2009 Toronto International Film Festival, and was named to TIFF's year-end Canada's Top Ten list for 2009. It subsequently won the awards for Best Short Film at the 2010 Victoria Film Festival, the 2010 Inside Out Film and Video Festival, the 2010 Nashville Film Festival, and the 53rd San Francisco International Film Festival.

References

External links

2009 films
Canadian LGBT-related short films
2009 LGBT-related films
Films directed by Jamie Travis
2000s English-language films
Canadian drama short films
2000s Canadian films